Club Cerro Corá, was a Paraguayan football club based in the city of Asunción (Paraguay). The club was founded March 1, 1925 and played in the Primera División B Metropolitana, the third division of Paraguayan football. Their home games were played at the Estadio General Andrés Rodríguez (named after the former Paraguayan president) which had a capacity of approximately 6,000 seats.

Honours
Torneo República: 1
1993

Paraguayan Second Division: 2
1990, 1996

Paraguayan Third Division: 3
1956, 1968, 1976

Performance in CONMEBOL competitions
Copa CONMEBOL: 2 appearances
1993: Quarter-Finals
1998: First Round

Notable players
To appear in this section a player must have either:
 Played at least 125 games for the club.
 Set a club record or won an individual award while at the club.
 Been part of a national team at any time.
 Played in the first division of any other football association (outside of Paraguay).
 Played in a continental and/or intercontinental competition.

1990's
 Ricardo Ismael Rojas (1990)
   Mitsuhide Tsuchida (1991)
 Casiano Delvalle (1992–1993, 1995)
 Edgar Aguilera (1993–1998)
 Julio César Romero (1995)
 César Augusto Ramírez (1995–1996)
 Blas López  (1997–2001)
2000's
 Julio César Manzur (2000–2002)
 Javier Mercedes González (2000–2001, 2003–2004)
 Antony Silva (2000–2002)
Non-CONMEBOL players

External links
Club Cerro Corá Info

Cerro Cora
Cerro Cora
Association football clubs established in 1925
1925 establishments in Paraguay